Fleutiauxellus is a genus of beetles belonging to the family Elateridae.

The species of this genus are found in Europe, Japan and Northern America.

Species:
 Fleutiauxellus algidus (Sahlberg, 1883)

References

Elateridae
Elateridae genera